We'll Talk About Love Later is a 1953 West German comedy film directed by Karl Anton and starring Gustav Fröhlich, Maria Holst and Liselotte Pulver.

It was shot at the Tempelhof Studios in Berlin. The film's sets were designed by Hans Jürgen Kiebach and Gabriel Pellon.

Cast

References

Bibliography 
 Bock, Hans-Michael & Bergfelder, Tim. The Concise Cinegraph: Encyclopaedia of German Cinema. Berghahn Books, 2009.

External links 
 

1953 films
1953 comedy films
German comedy films
West German films
1950s German-language films
Films directed by Karl Anton
Films shot at Tempelhof Studios
German black-and-white films
1950s German films